Isa Quensel (21 September 1905 – 3 November 1981) was a Swedish actress and operatic soprano who appeared in over 50 films, plays, operas, TV and radio shows. In 1939 she created the title role in the world premiere of Erich Wolfgang Korngold's Die Kathrin at the Royal Swedish Opera.

Partial filmography

 The Million Dollars (1926) - Journalist
 Kärlek måste vi ha (1931) - Cora
 The Love Express (1932) - Detective's Niece
 Jolly Musicians (1932) - Margit, his daughter
 House Slaves (1933) - Greta
 Pettersson & Bendel (1933) - Elsa Wallin
 Love and Dynamite (1933) - Rosa
 False Greta (1934) - Lisa
 Äventyr på hotell (1934) - Elly
 Raggen (1936) - Maria alias Raggen
 Min svärmor - dansösen (1936) - Sylvia
 The Girls of Uppakra (1936) - Elsa Brummell
 En flicka kommer till sta'n (1937) - Ulla Frank
 Happy Vestköping (1937) - Ann-Marie Brandt
 Wanted (1939) - Ulla Ståhle
 Marianne (1953) - Marianne's Mother
 The Chieftain of Göinge (1953) - Black-Elsa
 The Glass Mountain (1953) - Luiza Cabral
 The Unicorn (1955) - Harriet's Mother
 Moon Over Hellesta (1956) - Emmy Anckarberg
 Gårdarna runt sjön (1957) - Mathilde
 A Guest in His Own House (1957) - Stepmother
 Seventeen Years Old (1957) - Agnes Bentick
 The Lady in Black (1958) - Cecilia von Schilden
 The Koster Waltz (1958) - Doris Fågelström
 Playing on the Rainbow (1958) - Björn's Mother
 The Phantom Carriage (1958) - Maria
 Laila (1958) - Elli Logje
 Do You Believe in Angels? (1961) - Louise Günther
 Two Living, One Dead (1961) - Miss Larousse
 Pärlemor (1961) - Gertrude Odenstam
 Sällskapslek (1963) - Agda Stjernesten
 To Love (1964) - Märta
 Swedish Wedding Night (1964) - Hilma Palm
 Loving Couples (1964) - Fredrika von Strussenhjelm
 The Cats (1965) - Tora
 Woman of Darkness (1966)- Grave-Karna
 Mästerdetektiven Blomkvist på nya äventyr (1966, TV Movie) - Hilda Krikonblad
 Nya hyss av Emil i Lönneberga (1972) - Krösa-Maja (voice, uncredited)
 Emil and the Piglet (1973) - Krösa-Maja (voice)
 Agaton Sax och Byköpings gästabud (1976) - Aunt Tilda (voice)

Further reading

External links

1905 births
1981 deaths
Swedish operatic sopranos
Swedish film actresses
Swedish television actresses
20th-century Swedish actresses
20th-century Swedish women  opera singers